Matthews Ridge may refer to:

Matthews Ridge, Guyana, a village in Guyana
Matthews Ridge, Antarctica, a snow-covered ridge on the south side of Tapsell Foreland, Victoria Land